The IEEE Transactions on Software Engineering is a monthly peer-reviewed scientific journal published by the IEEE Computer Society. It was established in 1975 and covers the area of software engineering. It is considered the leading journal in this field.

Abstracting and indexing
The journal is abstracted and indexed in the Science Citation Index Expanded and Current Contents/Engineering, Computing & Technology. According to the Journal Citation Reports, the journal has a 2021 impact factor of 9.322.

Past editors-in-chief

See also
 IEEE Software
 IET Software

References

External links
 

Transactions on Software Engineering
Computer science journals
Software engineering publications
Monthly journals
Publications established in 1975
English-language journals